Colegio Anglo Americano Prescott is a school in Arequipa, Peru, named after William H. Prescott an American scientific historian. The school was founded in 1965 by a group of British, American and Peruvian citizens; it retains its bilingual emphasis, maintaining a student exchange program with several English-speaking schools.  Colegio Prescott offers an International Baccalaureate program.

Locals throughout its history 
April 1965: The first local was opened in "Vallecito"   

In this local classes were given to 4 and 5 year olds.

Founders 

 Founders of the school dreamt of having a mixed-sex school in Arequipa that gave emphasis to English subjects, after all, most of the founders were British or Americans themselves.
 Mary Burgess
 John Banks
 Gwynne Schultz
 Rosemary Latham de Barreda
 Samuel Lozada Tamayo
 Eduardo Bedoya Forga
 Werner Foulkes
 Arnolfo Valdivia Ampuero
 Allan Kelly
 Jeannette Ricketts
 Mrs. Rosemary Latham de Barreda is still a member of the institution. She usually visits school on important days like the school anniversary.

References

External links 
 Official website

Elementary and primary schools in Peru
International Baccalaureate schools in Peru
Buildings and structures in Arequipa
High schools and secondary schools in Peru